Greg Hembree (born August 21, 1960) is an American politician. He is a member of the South Carolina Senate from the 28th District, serving since 2012. He is a member of the Republican party.

References

Living people
1960 births
Republican Party South Carolina state senators
21st-century American politicians
University of Memphis alumni
University of South Carolina School of Law alumni